Frittenden Road was a railway station on the Kent and East Sussex Railway which closed in 1954. The wooden station building lay derelict for years and was destroyed by fire in October 2003.

As of 2012 most of the building's brick base still survives, and the general shape of the platform is still evident but much overgrown. The site is used by a joinery business whose premises straddle the trackbed immediately to the north of the old station.

References

External links
 Frittenden Road station at Disused-Stations.org.uk
 Frittenden Road station on navigable 1940 O. S. map

Disused railway stations in Kent
Former Kent and East Sussex Railway stations
Railway stations in Great Britain opened in 1905
Railway stations in Great Britain closed in 1954
1905 establishments in England
1954 disestablishments in England